Academia Peak is a peak rising to 1,253 m in the Friesland Ridge, Tangra Mountains on eastern Livingston Island in Antarctica.  The peak has precipitous and ice-free north-western slopes and surmounts Huntress Glacier to the northwest and southwest. It was first ascended and GPS-surveyed by the Bulgarian climbers D. Boyanov, N. Petkov and N. Hazarbasanov from Nesebar Gap via the head of Huntress Glacier on 15 January 2017.

The peak is named for the Bulgarian Academy of Sciences (established 1869) for its important role in the Bulgarian Antarctic research.

Location
The peak is located 1 km northwest of St. Boris Peak, 2.96 km south by southeast of the summit of Pliska Ridge and 3.9 km east by southeast of Willan Nunatak. The peak was first mapped by Bulgaria in 2005, and later in 2009.

See also
 Bulgarian toponyms in Antarctica
 Antarctic Place-names Commission

Maps
 L.L. Ivanov et al. Antarctica: Livingston Island and Greenwich Island, South Shetland Islands. Scale 1:100000 topographic map. Sofia: Antarctic Place-names Commission of Bulgaria, 2005.
 L.L. Ivanov. Antarctica: Livingston Island and Greenwich, Robert, Snow and Smith Islands. Scale 1:120000 topographic map.  Troyan: Manfred Wörner Foundation, 2009.
 Antarctic Digital Database (ADD). Scale 1:250000 topographic map of Antarctica. Scientific Committee on Antarctic Research (SCAR). Since 1993, regularly upgraded and updated.
 L.L. Ivanov. Antarctica: Livingston Island and Smith Island. Scale 1:100000 topographic map. Manfred Wörner Foundation, 2017.

Gallery

Notes

References
 Academia Peak. SCAR Composite Gazetteer of Antarctica
 Reference Map
 Bulgarian Antarctic Gazetteer. Antarctic Place-names Commission. (details in Bulgarian, basic data in English)

External links
 Academia Peak. Copernix satellite image

Tangra Mountains
Bulgarian Academy of Sciences